Neptunea hedychra is a species of sea snail, a marine gastropod mollusk in the family Buccinidae, the true whelks.

Description

Neptunea hedychra has a conical spiral shell. It has light colouration and can have tan bands running horizontally along the snail shell.

Distribution

References

Buccinidae
Gastropods described in 2007